The Albert Retan House is a historic house at 506 North Elm Street in Little Rock, Arkansas.  The house is a -story wood-frame structure, with a complex cross-gabled hip roof configuration studded by gabled projections.  The exterior is finished in wooden clapboards, and it has a single-story wraparound porch with turned posts and delicate woodwork balustrade and spindled frieze.  The house was built in 1893 for Albert Retan, an early investor in the Pulaski Heights subdivision where it stands.

The house was listed on the National Register of Historic Places in 1980.

See also
National Register of Historic Places listings in Little Rock, Arkansas

References

Houses on the National Register of Historic Places in Arkansas
Queen Anne architecture in Arkansas
Colonial Revival architecture in Arkansas
Houses completed in 1893
Houses in Little Rock, Arkansas
National Register of Historic Places in Little Rock, Arkansas
Historic district contributing properties in Arkansas
1893 establishments in Arkansas